Split EP! is a split EP from American indie hip hop artists Why? and Odd Nosdam. It was released on Anticon in 2001. The EP consists of Why?'s You'll Know Where Your Plane Is... and Odd Nosdam's EAT.

Reception
Darren Keast of SF Weekly gave the EP a mixed review, saying: "While Split EP! provides a welcome respite from the conservatism of rap, it also sends up a red flag -- a warning that Anticon's 'alternative' might evolve into a samey-sounding cottage industry."

Track listing
 You'll Know Where Your Plane Is...
 Untitled (0:24)  
 Untitled (2:11)
 Untitled (1:29)
 Untitled (1:50)
 Untitled (1:00)
 Untitled (2:12)
 Untitled (3:49)
 EAT
 Untitled (1:27)
 Untitled (1:51)
 Untitled (1:11)
 Untitled (1:43)
 Untitled (2:09)
 Untitled (1:03)
 Untitled (2:06)
 Untitled (31:07)
 Untitled (7:59)

References

External links
 

2001 EPs
Anticon EPs
Alternative hip hop EPs